Adrian Hanauer (born February 7, 1966) is an American businessman and majority owner of Seattle Sounders FC of Major League Soccer. He is also one of the minority owners of the Seattle Kraken of the National Hockey League, and a former minority owner of Reign FC, a team in the National Women's Soccer League now known as OL Reign.

Business history 
Hanauer's family owned the Pacific Coast Feather Company, a down pillow, feather bed, and high-end bedding products manufacturer that was founded in 1884 in Germany, and is now headquartered in Seattle. While Hanauer never held an executive position within the company, he began working at the company at 13.
 
Hanauer founded Museum Quality Framing, which is a chain of custom frame stores in Washington, Oregon, and Idaho, in 1988. Hanauer used to own a chain of pizza stores called Mad Pizza. As an early investor in Amazon and aQuantive, an online based advertising company, Hanauer turned a substantial profit when the latter company went public in 2000 and again when Microsoft purchased the company in 2007.

He became the managing partner for the USL Seattle Sounders in 2002 and began reducing the financial losses the team was taking, $1 million per year for the five years proceeding Hanauer's taking over the team, and reduced the losses to $350,000 per year. The team also attained success on the field under Hanauer's leadership, going 23-4-1 in his first season, the second best record in USL history, and made it to the league championship game three times, winning it twice. Hanauer also began working on getting a Major League Soccer team in Seattle. The league passed over Seattle in 2004, choosing instead to expand to better prepared Salt Lake City. Hanauer invested $250,000 for a 15 percent stake in an English soccer team Cambridge United FC in May 2007.

Following the MLS All Star game in July 2007, Hanauer was introduced to Hollywood executive, director, and film producer Joe Roth by MLS commissioner Don Garber. The two men hit it off and over the next few weeks, Roth made several visits to Seattle to take in a few Sounders games and get to know Hanauer better. By November, the two had brought in Microsoft co-founder Paul Allen and comedian Drew Carey as investors and MLS had announced Seattle as the next expansion team.

In 2005, Hanauer founded business incubator and venture capital company Curious Office Partners.  The company invests in small internet startup companies and offers them office space in Pioneer Square and invests between US$10,000 and $250,000 in the startups.

In 2018, he and his brother sold the Pacific Coast Feather Company.

Personal life 
Hanauer's interest in soccer began at the age of 3, he saw his first North American Soccer League Sounders game at the age of 8, and he was one of only two freshmen to make the soccer team for Mercer Island High School. While Hanauer did not make the team as a sophomore, he continued to play soccer, first on an intramural team while attending University of Washington and now on two teams in the Greater Seattle Soccer League.

References

External links

Living people
1966 births
University of Washington alumni
Businesspeople from Seattle
Major League Soccer executives
OL Reign owners
Seattle Sounders FC
Mercer Island High School alumni